The Iranian ambassador in Manama is the official representative of the Government in Tehran to the Government of Bahrain. 

In 1972 a declaration on the establishment of political relations between the governments was issued at the embassy level in Tehran and Manama.

List of representatives

See also
Bahrain–Iran relations

References 

 
Bahrain
Iran